Yukthi Rekha (യുക്തിരേഖ) is a rationalist periodical published monthly in Malayalam. It is the official magazine of the organisation, Kerala Yukthivadi Sangham. It was founded in 1984 by Kerala Yukthivadi Sangham, a rationalist organisation. Pavanan was the founder-editor of the magazine. Kesavan Vellikulangara served on the editorial board of the magazine.

References

1984 establishments in Kerala
Anthropology magazines
Magazines established in 1984
Malayalam-language magazines
Marxist magazines
Mass media in Kerala
Monthly magazines published in India
Philosophy magazines
Political magazines published in India